The 2018 Hong Kong Tennis Open (also known as the Prudential Hong Kong Tennis Open for sponsorship reasons) was a professional tennis tournament played on hard courts.  It was the ninth edition of the tournament, and part of the 2018 WTA Tour. It took place in Victoria Park, Hong Kong, from October 8 to 14.

Points and prize money

Point distribution

Prize money

1 Qualifiers prize money is also the Round of 32 prize money
* per team

Singles main-draw entrants

Seeds

 1 Rankings are as of October 1, 2018

Other entrants
The following players received wildcards into the singles main draw:
 Eudice Chong
 Priscilla Hon
 Zhang Ling

The following player received entry using a protected ranking into the singles main draw:
 Kristína Kučová

The following players received entry from the qualifying draw:
 Nao Hibino
 Ons Jabeur
 Lesley Kerkhove
 Bibiane Schoofs
 Sabina Sharipova
 Fanny Stollár

The following players received entry as lucky losers:
 Caroline Dolehide
 Julia Glushko
 Viktoriya Tomova

Withdrawals
Before the tournament
  Ekaterina Makarova → replaced by  Caroline Dolehide
  Naomi Osaka → replaced by  Julia Glushko
  Bernarda Pera → replaced by  Luksika Kumkhum
  Lesia Tsurenko → replaced by  Viktoriya Tomova
  Sachia Vickery → replaced by  Kristína Kučová

Doubles main-draw entrants

Seeds

1 Rankings are as of October 1, 2018

Other entrants 
The following pairs received wildcards into the doubles main draw:
  Eudice Chong /  Zhang Ling
  Ng Kwan-yau /  Elina Svitolina

Champions

Singles

  Dayana Yastremska def.  Wang Qiang, 6–2, 6–1

Doubles

  Samantha Stosur /  Zhang Shuai def.  Shuko Aoyama /  Lidziya Marozava 6–4, 6–4

References

External links
Official site

Hong Kong Open (tennis)
Hong Kong Open (tennis)
2018 in Hong Kong sport
Hong Kong Tennis Open
2018 in Chinese tennis